Ihor Kostyantynovych Hlavan (born 25 September 1990 in Nazarivka) is a Ukrainian race walker. He competed at the 2012 and 2016 Summer Olympics. He finished third in the 2013 World Championships and fourth at the 2015 and 2017 World Championships.

International competitions

Personal bests

Outdoor
5000 metres walk – 19:11.87 (Kyiv 2014)
10,000 metres walk – 41:49.65 (Mukachevo 2016)
20 kilometres walk – 1:19:59 (Taicang 2014)
35 metres walk – 2:31:40 (Ivano-Frankivsk 2017)
50 kilometres walk – 3:40:39 (Moscow 2013) NR

Indoor
5000 metres walk – 19:13.25 (Kyiv 2016)
10,000 metres walk – 39:06.06 (Sumy 2014) NR

References

External links

Ukrainian male racewalkers
1990 births
Living people
Olympic athletes of Ukraine
Athletes (track and field) at the 2012 Summer Olympics
Athletes (track and field) at the 2016 Summer Olympics
World Athletics Championships athletes for Ukraine
Universiade medalists in athletics (track and field)
Universiade silver medalists for Ukraine
Medalists at the 2015 Summer Universiade
Recipients of the Order of Danylo Halytsky
Sportspeople from Kirovohrad Oblast